Kim Ye-won (born Kim Yubin; December 11, 1987) is a South Korean actress and singer. She is known for acting in Suspicious Partner, Rich Man and Welcome to Waikiki 2.

Filmography

Film

Television series

Web series

Web show

Music video

Musical theatre

Radio shows

Discography

Awards and nominations

References

External links

1987 births
Living people
People from Seongnam
21st-century South Korean actresses
Chung-Ang University alumni
JYP Entertainment artists
South Korean film actresses
South Korean musical theatre actresses
South Korean television actresses